Campus Hoopla is an American game show that ran on the NBC Television network from December 27, 1946, until it ended on December 12, 1947.

Format
The show was centered on a group of teenagers ("complete with 'cheerleaders' and 'students'") in a soda shop. Episodes included up-to-date sports scores and film footage from recent games.

Cast
Lou Little - Host
Bob Stanton - Sports Reporter
Eva Marie Saint - Commercial Spokeswoman
Carleton Carpenter - A soda shop dancer

Long Island University basketball coach and author Clair Bee was also featured on the program.

Owen Davis, Jr. was the producer.

Episode status
Episode segments of live TV broadcasts (video and audio) of Campus Hoopla dating from 1947 exist in the Hubert Chain Collection of the earliest kinescopes still in existence, as preserved in the Library of Congress (Moving Image Collection).  Audio recordings of live TV broadcasts of this show are also on file at the Library of Congress from the 1946–47 period, as recorded from WNBT-TV in New York (NBC's original flagship station in New York City, today's WNBC-TV).

Sponsor 
Eva Marie Saint, the cheerleader who did live Keds sneakers commercials on this program, also talks about her performance on this early TV show along with photos in 1947 and 1949 issues of Life magazine. The show was sponsored by U.S. Rubber (makers of Keds). Billboard reviews from 1946–47 pan the show as an example of TV mediocrity, but it had a loyal following on early TV.

See also
1947-48 United States network television schedule

References

External links 
 
NBC original programming
1946 American television series debuts
1947 American television series endings
1940s American game shows
Black-and-white American television shows
English-language television shows